Viktor Sokol or Viktar Sokal may refer to:

 Viktor Sokol (footballer born 1954), Soviet and Belarusian footballer
 Viktor Sokol (footballer born 1981), Belarusian footballer, son of above

See also
Sokol (surname)